Full Tilt! Pinball is a pinball video game developed by Cinematronics and published by Maxis in 1995. It features pre-rendered 3D graphics and three tables—Space Cadet, Skullduggery, and Dragon's Keep. On each table, there are displays on the side that show the players' score, ball number, player number, a display for various information and a table-specific image.

Tables

Space Cadet 
The Space Cadet table features the player as a member of a space fleet that completes missions to increase rank. Players can attain nine different ranks (listed from lowest to highest): Cadet, Ensign, Lieutenant, Captain, LT Commander, Commander, Commodore, Admiral, and Fleet Admiral. Players accept a mission by hitting "mission targets" which select which mission they will take, and by going up the "launch ramp". Each mission has a set number of things for players to do, such as hitting the "attack bumpers" (which are a set of four bumpers at the top of the table) eight times (this is the "target practice" mission). Some missions involve a number of steps which must be completed in sequence. Missions end either by being completed, or by being aborted due to running out of "fuel", as indicated by the lights in the passage that passes under the launch ramp. The "fuel" lights go out one by one at a time interval, and can be re-lit by having the ball go over them, or all at once by going up the launch ramp again. Upon completing a mission, some of the blue lights in a circle in the middle of the table turn on. When all of the lights in the blue circle turn on, the player's rank increases, and a light in the orange circle turns on.

Skullduggery 

The Skullduggery table features a treasure hunt where the player must find pirate Peg Leg's loot. The player can accomplish that two ways: either by piecing together a treasure map or by activating and completing a series of mini-games on the table called modes. Modes are like missions and quests of the other two tables. They are all pirate themed mini-games, such as ship battle, tavern fight, escape Bermuda Triangle, mutiny, and sword fight.

Dragon's Keep 
The Dragon's Keep table features a fantasy environment where players must accomplish various quests, leading to the slaying of a dragon. The quests include Dragon Hoard (steal the hoard), Fire Lizard Attack (defeat the fire-lizard), Rescue Maiden (rescue the damsel in distress), Dragon Pass (find the path to dragon's lair), Wizard's Fury, and Slay Dragon. The player can acquire awards such as spells, weapons, and armors. While weapons simply add points to the score, armors and spells temporarily turn on various gates, magnets, and chutes on the table to change the gameplay.

Elements from each of the three tables were elected for representation by Maxis in the illustration for the box art by Marc Ericksen, creating a montage below a hurtling Pinball.

3D Pinball for Windows – Space Cadet 

3D Pinball for Windows – Space Cadet, also known as Pinball, is a version of the Space Cadet table bundled with Microsoft Windows. It was originally packaged with Microsoft Plus! 95 and later included in Windows NT 4.0, Windows 2000, Windows ME, and Windows XP. This version of Pinball, ported to Windows NT by David Plummer at Microsoft, was a port of the game using the original art and sound. It was developed in C++ for cross-platform support because Windows NT supported RISC processors and prior versions of the game contained x86 assembly language and 16-bit logic. The Windows 98 installation CD has instructions on installing Pinball 3D on this version of Windows which are partly wrong; Microsoft later issued an updated support article. Windows XP was the last client release of Windows to include this game. Raymond Chen said his proudest work on Windows XP was reducing the amount of CPU that Pinball used when it was ported from Windows 95.

The look and feel of Full Tilt! Pinball and 3D Pinball are similar, with a few exceptions: The latter contains only the Space Cadet table and only supports 640×480-pixel resolution, while the former supports three different resolutions up to 1024×768 pixels. The image on the side is a two-dimensional image as opposed to pre-rendered 3D. The words Maxis and Cinematronics have been changed from the yellow to a dark red, making them harder to see. It sports a splash screen that merely says 3D Pinball and shows a small pinball graphic with faded edges. Music is not enabled by default in 3D Pinball. It has fewer soundtracks that are inspired by the original game. A hidden test mode is also available.

There are only a few minor differences between the gameplay of the two versions. The completion of a mission in the Maxis version results in a replay—actually a ball save, rather than a special—being awarded. In addition, hitting a wormhole that has the same color light locks the ball, which if done repeatedly activates the multi-ball round. This is not the case in 3D Pinball: Completing a mission merely awards bonus points and hitting a wormhole in the above circumstances awards a replay. Also, the three yellow lights above the bumpers (both in the launch ramp and in the upper table zone) act differently: In 3D Pinball these are turned off if the ball passes on them while they are on. This is not the case in the original game, where they just remain activated.

Discontinuation 
According to Microsoft employee Raymond Chen, 3D Pinball for Windows – Space Cadet was first removed from later releases of Windows due to a collision detection bug during early development of 64-bit versions of Windows, originally for the Alpha AXP architecture. Microsoft was unable to resolve the issue in time for the release of Windows XP 64-Bit Edition for the Itanium architecture in 2002, and it was assumed for some time to be the reason for the game's absence from Windows Vista and subsequent versions.

However, the 2005 release of Windows XP Professional x64 Edition includes an official 64-bit build of Pinball, which was found to have only minor graphical glitches. Following this discovery, a YouTube investigation later cited by Chen in a follow-up post revealed working versions of 64-bit Pinball are also found on the CD-ROM for the 2003 update of Windows XP 64-Bit Edition and even in some early Windows Vista builds (then known as "Longhorn") for both IA-64 and x64.

The final versions of Windows to include the game were the first released builds after the reset of the Longhorn project to start over with a fresh codebase, now for x86 and x64 only. These builds are also the final ones to still feature the other original Windows games from earlier versions, as opposed to the completely redesigned ones by Oberon Games that were publicly introduced in build 5219. This has led to speculation that, like the classic versions of the other games, Pinball was ultimately removed from Windows due to its visual style being considered outdated.

In late 2018, Raymond Chen stated that there were multiple attempts to revive the game as a Microsoft Garage project. They were apparently successful in repackaging the x86 version. However, as Microsoft contacted the legal department to review the original license contract, it was found that newer versions of the game are only permitted to be released pre-packaged with subsequent Windows operating systems and Microsoft Plus! packs. The license also forbade the release of the source code.

Full Tilt! Pinball 2 
Full Tilt! Pinball 2 was released in 1996 and features three new tables: Mad Scientist, Alien Daze and Captain Hero.

Reception 
Reviewing the Windows version, a reviewer for Next Generation said that while the Space Cadet table is fairly good, the other two tables suffer from cluttered graphics and weak ball physics, making them "incredibly difficult to follow." He gave it two out of five stars.

3D Pinball Space Cadet gained a cult following, and tutorials showing how to install it on modern versions of Microsoft Windows have been published.

Impact 

On March 6, 2020, the sound effects of Space Cadet were sampled in a song, "You Better Move" by Lil Uzi Vert, containing elements from the game. It captured positive reception from many fans who grew up playing the game.

See also 
 List of games included with Windows

References

External links 

Full Tilt! Pinball Windows 95 demo
Source code

1995 video games
Electronic Arts franchises
Classic Mac OS games
Maxis games
Pinball video games
Windows games
Windows 95
Discontinued Windows components
Microsoft games
Science fiction video games
Video games developed in the United States
Video games set in outer space